Reinunga Station is a railway station in Aurland, Norway, on the Flåm Line that links Flåm to Myrdal and the Oslo-Bergen train line. The station opened in 1942.

Reinunga Station is a popular starting point for hiking in the summer and ski touring in the winter. The station is near Kjosfossen waterfall, Reinungavatnet lake and the Rallarvegen path. It is also surrounded by mountains with Tarven on one side and Geitonosi on the other.

Reinunga station changed its name from Kjosfoss in 1977 and used to have accommodation for the railway workers.

References
Bibliography

Notes

Railway stations on the Flåm Line
Railway stations in Aurland
Railway stations opened in 1942
1942 establishments in Norway